The Friedrich Engels Guards Regiment (also known as NVA Guard Regiment 1) was a special guard unit of the Land Forces of the National People's Army. The regiment was named after Friedrich Engels, the German socialist that collaborated with Karl Marx in systematizing Marxism.

Mission

It served representative purposes and for surveillance of various landmarks in NVA East Berlin, including the City headquarters, the office of the Ministry of National Defense of the GDR in East Berlin, and the branch office of the Administration of MND Intelligence in Berlin-Köpenick.

The regiment's headquarters was with the patrol commander of the town in Friedrich-Engels-Kaserne, Am Kupfergraben 1 stationed in Berlin. It had seven companies, most of which were made up of conscripts.

Three companies were honor guard companies for the protocol service, the honor guard at the "Memorial to the Victims of Fascism and Militarism" in the Neue Wache and the Great Wachaufzug held weekly on Wednesday at 14:30 was the Guards Parade.
 
Four companies were guard companies, one of which consisted of reservists.

History
The guard regiment was formed by order No. 99/62 of the Minister of National Defense of the GDR. Its duties were guard duty, guard of honor, honor parade (Ehrenparade), and implementation of the military ceremony.

The guard regiment was established in 1962 from parts of the Hugo Eberlein Guards Regiment but wasn't given the title "Friedrich Engels" until 1970. As only Allied troops could be stationed in Berlin due to the special status of the city, the regiment was formally subordinate to the garrison commander.

The main tasks were the ceremonial presentation of the honor guard at the memorial on Unter den Linden (New Guard) and the Greater Changing of the Guard held every Wednesday and was always quite a spectacle. In addition, the honor companies as formations honor to welcome state guests from the GDR were used. Special duties by the regiment were also performed at the Great Tattoo, other guards of honor, honor companies at funerals of senior figures and wreath-laying ceremonies.

The soldiers of the guard regiment "Friedrich Engels" were generally conscripts who served for 18 months. The presentation weapon was the SKS rifle - in the army under the name "S carabiner led". Each soldier of honor companies had two carbines, a training and a performance carbine. The honor guard at the Unter den Linden was equipped with their own rifles whose bolt and bayonet were chromed.
 
The Regiment was dissolved along with the rest of the NVA in 1990.

Uniforms

Its uniforms were nearly identical to those of those of National People's Army (NVA) and were distinguished primarily by the honorary cuffband on the left sleeve bearing the regiment's name.

Gallery

See also
 Wachbataillon - the West German equivalent.
 Guard Regiment Hugo Eberlein - The guard unit of the GDR MinDef
 Felix Dzerzhinsky Guards Regiment - The Guard unit of the MfS

External links
Wachregiment 1 „Friedrich Engels“ (German)
Militärisches Zeremoniell des Orchesters der NVA zu Staatsanlässen 1963

Guards regiments of the Landstreitkräfte
Military units and formations established in 1962
Military units and formations disestablished in 1990
Guards of honour
Friedrich Engels